Verbenalin is a chemical compound, classified as an iridoid glucoside, that is found in Verbena officinalis. It is one of the sleep-promoting (soporific) components in Verbena officinalis.

References

Glucosides
Iridoid glycosides
Cyclopentanes